Rajendravarman II was the king of the Khmer Empire (region of Angkor in Cambodia), from 944 to 968 AD.

Rajendravarman II was the uncle and first cousin of Harshavarman. His principal monuments, located in the Angkor region of Cambodia's Siem Reap province, are Pre Rup and East Mebon.

The king claimed links to the royal line of the Chenla state that had its capital at Bhavapura (the city's location is debated) and predates the start of the Khmer empire in 802 AD. Inscriptions say that the Khmer empire under his tutelage extended to southern Vietnam, Laos and much of Thailand and as far north as southern China.

An inscription at Pre Rup relates that Rajendravarman II was a great warrior, his sword frequently blood-stained, his body as hard as a diamond. Though the king punished the guilty, the inscription says, he had an ocean of compassion for the innocent. Other inscriptions depict him as organizer of state religious ritual. In one text, he gives an order for the collection of holy oil, in the form of butter, for use in temples.

The king ruled from a great palace designed by his minister Kavindrarimathana. Many scholars believe that Rajendravarman II instituted a system of centralized administration, establishing more direct control over a collection of princes who had been largely independent at their estates in the provinces.

Construction at Banteay Srei, the ornate temple of pink sandstone located north of the main Angkor complex, began during the king's reign.

Inscriptions from 946 AD say Rajendravarman II had victories over Ramanya and Champa.   Historians believe Ramanya was the area of the Mons of Eastern Dvaravati.
Rajendravarman II led fighting against the rival state of Champa in the east, and in 946 AD seized as booty a gold statue in the temple of Po Nagar there.

During his reign, the Khmer Empire had 24 cities or pura.

Rajendravarman II was succeeded by his 10-year-old son, who reigned as Jayavarman V.

References

 Mabbett, Ian and Chandler, David. The Khmers. Blackwell Publishers 1996. 

10th-century Cambodian monarchs
Khmer Empire
Year of birth missing
968 deaths